The 2019 Oklahoma Sooners football team represented the University of Oklahoma in the 2019 NCAA Division I FBS football season, the 125th season for the  Oklahoma Sooners. The team was led by Lincoln Riley, in his third year as head coach. They played their home games at Gaylord Family Oklahoma Memorial Stadium in Norman, Oklahoma. They are a charter member of the Big 12 Conference.

Oklahoma began the year ranked fourth in the AP Poll and were the overwhelming favorites to repeat as Big 12 Conference champions. The Sooners won their first seven games of the season before being upset on the road by Kansas State. On November 16, Oklahoma overcame a 25-point deficit to beat previously-undefeated Baylor, 34–31. Oklahoma finished conference play tied with Baylor for the best record in the conference with an 8–1 record, earning them each a spot in the Big 12 Championship Game. There, they defeated Baylor a second time, this time by a score of 30–23 in overtime, to win Oklahoma's fifth consecutive and 13th overall Big 12 title. In the final College Football Playoff rankings of the season, Oklahoma was ranked fourth, earning them a spot in the 2019 Peach Bowl, in a national semi-final game against first-seeded LSU. This was Oklahoma's third consecutive and fourth overall CFP bid. The Sooners fell to the Tigers, 63–28, to end the season at 12–2, and were ranked seventh in the final AP Poll.

The Sooners were led on offense by quarterback Jalen Hurts, a graduate transfer from Alabama that had previously played in three separate College Football Playoffs with the Crimson Tide. Hurts finished in second in the conference in both passing yards and rushing yards, and led the conference with 53 total touchdowns. He finished in second in voting for the Heisman Trophy. Wide receiver CeeDee Lamb was a consensus All-American. Hurts, Lamb, and center Creed Humphrey were named first-team all-conference. On defense, the team was led by first-team all-conference linebacker Kenneth Murray.

Previous season
The Sooners finished the season 12–1, 8–1 in Big 12 play. Finishing with the best record in conference play the Sooners clinched a berth in the conference championship game where they defeated Texas 39–27 to win their 12th Big 12 Championship. Oklahoma was selected as the fourth seed to play in the 2018 College Football playoff against first seed Alabama Crimson Tide in the 2018 Orange Bowl, which ended up being a 34–45 loss.

Preseason

Award watch lists 
Listed in the order that they were released

Big 12 media days
The 2019 Big 12 media days were held July 15–16, 2019 in Frisco, Texas. In the Big 12 preseason media poll, Oklahoma was predicted to finish atop the standings for the fourth consecutive year.

Preseason awards
2019 Preseason All-Big 12

Newcomer of the Year: Jalen Hurts, Oklahoma

Spring game

Schedule
Oklahoma announced its 2019 football schedule on October 18, 2018. The 2019 schedule consists of 6 home games, 5 away games and 1 neutral-site game in the regular season. The Sooners will host 2 non-conference games against Houston and South Dakota, and will travel to UCLA. Oklahoma will host Texas Tech, West Virginia, Iowa State, TCU and travel to Baylor, Kansas, Kansas State, and Oklahoma State in regular season conference play. Oklahoma will play Texas in Dallas, Texas at the Cotton Bowl Stadium on October 12 in the Red River Showdown, the 114th game played in the series.

Personnel

Roster

Coaching staff

Depth chart

Game summaries

Houston

South Dakota

at UCLA

Texas Tech

at Kansas

Kickoff was delayed from the original start time of 11:00 A.M. to 11:30 A.M. due to lightning and thunderstorms in the vicinity of the University of Kansas.

After the delay, it was called an "easy victory" for the Sooners even though Kansas "outplayed" the Sooners for the bulk of the first quarter.  Kansas even scored first with a touchdown after forcing Oklahoma to punt.  Kansas then gained 98 yards for their touchdown and led 7–0 in the first quarter.  Oklahoma then took control and led 21–7 at halftime.

Oklahoma managed 29 first downs and converted 6 of 9 times on third down, with 545 total yards of offense.  Oklahoma also threw an interception for the only turnover of the game.  Kansas only managed 18 first downs with 6–14 on third down. They also attempted 2 fourth-down conversions but both were unsuccessful, with a total of 360 yards of offense.  Kansas did manage a little more clock time of offense with 30:29 time of possession compared to Oklahoma's 29:31.  The final score was Oklahoma 45, Kansas 20.

Oklahoma completed their 22nd straight true road win, which was the second longest streak since at least World War II in major college football when Coach Bud Wilkinson led the sooners to 25 wins from 1953 to 1958.

vs Texas

West Virginia

at Kansas State

Oklahoma traveled to Manhattan expecting a relatively easy road win but instead were pushed to what experts expected to be a critical loss for the Sooners in their hunt for the national title.  The loss ended what was at the time the nation's longest road win streak.

Oklahoma's cornerback Parnell Motley was ejected from the game for unsportsmanlike conduct after kicking a Kansas State player.  Kansas State's Eric Gallon forced a key fumble on a kick return but in process suffered a severe knee injury and he missed the rest of the game.

K-State's Skylar Thompson threw for 213 yards and ran for four touchdowns.  Oklahoma nearly came back in the fourth quarter but the game concluded after an on-side kick for a 48–41 final score and Kansas State win.

Iowa State

Both Iowa State and Oklahoma lost their previous games.  Oklahoma could still be in the playoff chase by winning the remainder of their games and winning the Big 12 conference championship game.  Predictions call that the Oklahoma Defense will need to slow the Cyclone offense to win the game.  Coming into the game, it is listed as one of the most "compelling matchups" for the week by MSN Sports.

at Baylor

TCU

Oklahoma State

vs. Baylor (Big 12 Championship Game)

vs. LSU (Peach Bowl)

Statistics

Team

Offense

Defense

Key: POS: Position, SOLO: Solo Tackles, AST: Assisted Tackles, TOT: Total Tackles, TFL: Tackles-for-loss, SACK: Quarterback Sacks, INT: Interceptions, PD: Passes Defended, FF: Forced Fumbles, FR: Fumbles Recovered, BLK: Kicks or Punts Blocked, SAF: Safeties

Special teams

Scoring

Scores by quarter (non-conference opponents)

Scores by quarter (Big 12 opponents)

Scores by quarter (All opponents)

Rankings

Awards and honors

Postseason

Bowl game

2020 NFL draft

The 2020 NFL Draft will be held on April 23–25, 2020 in Paradise, Nevada.

Sooners who were picked in the 2020 NFL Draft:

References

Oklahoma
Oklahoma Sooners football seasons
Big 12 Conference football champion seasons
Oklahoma Sooners football